Gao Zhongxun (born 4 January 1965) is a Chinese former international football midfielder of Korean descent who spent the majority of his career with Jilin F.C. as well as representing China in the 1992 Asian Cup.

Playing career
Gao Zhongxun started his football career with his local football club Jilin F.C. and was considered a promising enough youngster to be called up to the Chinese U-20 squad that took part in the 1985 FIFA World Youth Championship where he played in all four games as China were knocked-out in the quarter-finals. His time within the Chinese youth set-up would continue when in 1988 the Chinese youth team were allowed to play within the Chinese league system and throughout the 1988 campaign he played for them as the team called themselves China B. Upon his return to Jilin FC he found them relegated not to the second division but to the third tier after the Chinese Football Association restructured the league system, however by the 1990 campaign he would be part of the squad that won the division title and promotion to the second tier. 

Gao's performances for Jilin would be considered impressive enough that despite playing for a second division side he would still be called up to the Chinese national team for the 1992 AFC Asian Cup and helped guide China to a third-place finish. This was followed by Jilin eventually gaining promotion back into the top tier in time for the first fully professional 1994 Chinese Jia-A League season.

Career statistics

International statistics

Honours
Jilin FC
Third Tier League: 1990

Personal life 
Gao Zhongxun's son, Gao Zhunyi, is also a footballer. He currently plays for Hebei China Fortune in the Chinese Super League.

References

External links
Team China Stats

1965 births
Living people
People from Yanbian
Chinese footballers
Footballers from Jilin
Chinese people of Korean descent
China international footballers
Asian Games silver medalists for China
Medalists at the 1994 Asian Games
Asian Games medalists in football
Association football midfielders
Footballers at the 1994 Asian Games